César Fernández de las Heras Caneda (born 10 May 1978), known simply as César, is a Spanish professional footballer who plays for SD Logroñés as a defender.

He played more than 380 matches in both the Segunda División and the Segunda División B, in a senior career that spanned more than two decades. In La Liga, he appeared for Athletic Bilbao.

Club career
César was born in Vitoria-Gasteiz, Álava. Another product of Athletic Bilbao's prolific youth system at Lezama, he could never however fully establish in the first team, only playing a maximum of ten matches in two different La Liga seasons, also having appeared in the 1998–99 UEFA Champions League. He was also loaned to UD Salamanca, Sevilla FC and Racing de Santander, all in the Segunda División (he won promotion with the latter two, being regularly used).

After his permanent release in 2005, César resumed his career in the second division. He appeared regularly for SD Eibar, Cádiz CF and Deportivo Alavés, but suffered two consecutive relegations with the last two clubs.

In the summer of 2009, César joined Segunda División B side CD Guijuelo, switching to another team in that tier, CD Mirandés, for 2010–11. On 24 January 2012, the 33-year-old scored in the last minute of a 2–1 home win against RCD Espanyol in the quarter-finals of the Copa del Rey following a free kick from Pablo Infante – the competition's top scorer – as the minnows from Castile and León reached the last-four stage after a 4–4 aggregate score.

César returned to the lower leagues in 2015, going on to represent Racing Santander, UD Logroñés and SD Logroñés well into his 40s. In August 2022, he played in a pre-season friendly against Deportivo Alavés B, whose team included his 19-year-old son Aritz.

References

External links

Stats and bio at Cadistas1910 

1978 births
Living people
Spanish footballers
Footballers from Vitoria-Gasteiz
Association football defenders
La Liga players
Segunda División players
Segunda División B players
Primera Federación players
CD Aurrerá de Vitoria footballers
Bilbao Athletic footballers
Athletic Bilbao footballers
UD Salamanca players
Sevilla FC players
Racing de Santander players
SD Eibar footballers
Cádiz CF players
Deportivo Alavés players
CD Guijuelo footballers
CD Mirandés footballers
UD Logroñés players
SD Logroñés players
Spain youth international footballers